Ashcreek is a Southwest Portland, Oregon neighborhood.  It borders Maplewood to the north, Multnomah and Crestwood to the east, Far Southwest to the south, and the Washington County communities of Garden Home–Whitford and Tigard to the west.  Though like the city itself it lies mostly in Multnomah County, it extends a short distance into Washington County in several places on its western side.

References

External links 
Guide to Ashcreek Neighborhood (PortlandNeighborhood.com)

Neighborhoods in Portland, Oregon